Astin Dar may refer to:

Astin Dar-e Olya
Astin Dar-e Sofla
Astin Dar-e Vosta